State Highway 205 (SH 205) is a Texas state highway that runs from SH 78 at Lavon to US 80 at Terrell.  This route was designated on May 15, 1934, from Terrell to Rockwall, and was extended north to Lavon on September 1, 1939. The route has been under heavy construction since 2006 as part of a new expansion and widening project, and was scheduled to be completed in 2011. The highway has a bypass road as well, John King Blvd., which begins near the Collin county border, and ends just before the intersection with Farm to Market Road 549.

Route description
SH 205 begins at a junction with US 80 and FM 148 in Terrell.  It heads northwest from this junction to an intersection with FM 1392.  The highway continues to the northwest to an intersection with FM 548.  Heading towards the northwest, the highway continues to a junction with FM 550 in McLendon-Chisholm.  The highway continues to the northwest to an intersection with FM 549 in Rockwall.  It continues to the northwest through Rockwall to a junction with SH 276.  As the highway continues to the northwest through Rockwall, it intersects I-30.  It turns towards the north from this junction to an intersection with FM 740.  The highway continues to the north through Rockwall to an intersection with SH 66.  Heading towards the north, the highway continues to a junction with FM 552 before leaving Rockwall.  SH 205 reaches its northern terminus at SH 78 in Lavon.

Junction list

References

205
Transportation in Kaufman County, Texas
Transportation in Rockwall County, Texas
Transportation in Collin County, Texas